Robert W. Monk (March 28, 1866 – March 17, 1924) was an American physician and politician.

Born near Fond du Lac, Wisconsin, Monk moved to Sheboygan County, Wisconsin with his parents in 1868 and went to public schools and went to a commercial college in Fond du Lac. Monk then worked for railroad and express companies in Menasha, Wisconsin. He moved to St. Cloud, Calumet County, Wisconsin and was in the general merchandise business. He sold the business, went to Northwestern University Medical School (now Feinberg School of Medicine) and graduated in 1894. Monk practiced medicine in St. Cloud, Wisconsin and then moved to Chilton, Wisconsin and continued to practice medicine. During that time Monk served as mayor of Chilton, Wisconsin and also served on the Calumet County Board of Supervisors. Monk then went to Chicago, Illinois and took post graduate study in medicine for one year. In 1906, Monk moved to Neillsville, Wisconsin and continued to practice medicine. From 1913 to 1917, Monk served in the Wisconsin State Senate and was a Republican. Monk was then elected mayor of Neillsville and was in office until his death. Monk died at his home in Neillsville, Wisconsin of pernicious anemia.

Notes

1866 births
1924 deaths
People from Chilton, Wisconsin
People from Neillsville, Wisconsin
Politicians from Fond du Lac, Wisconsin
People from Sheboygan County, Wisconsin
Feinberg School of Medicine alumni
Businesspeople from Wisconsin
Physicians from Wisconsin
County supervisors in Wisconsin
Mayors of places in Wisconsin
Republican Party Wisconsin state senators
People from Calumet County, Wisconsin